The history of the Jews in San Marino reaches back to the Middle Ages.

San Marino is a small land locked country in central Italy. There has been a Jewish presence in San Marino for at least 600 years.

The first mention of Jews in San Marino dates to the late 14th century, in official documents recording the business transactions of Jews. There are many documents throughout the 15th to 17th centuries describing Jewish dealings and verifying the presence of a Jewish community in San Marino. Jews were required to wear special badges and live by specific restrictions, but were also afforded official protection from the government and had never to live in a ghetto.

During World War II, San Marino provided a harbor for more than 100,000 Italians and Jews from Nazi and Italian persecution. Today, there are only small numbers of Jews in San Marino.

See also 
 History of the Jews in Italy
 Italian Jews

References

Jews
San Marino
Jewish
Ethnic groups in San Marino
San Marino